Brushy Fork is a stream in Miller County in the U.S. state of Missouri. It is a tributary of Tavern Creek.

Brushy Fork was so named due to the abundance of brush along its course.

See also
List of rivers of Missouri

References

Rivers of Miller County, Missouri
Rivers of Missouri